D.110 is a  long east-west state road running from the border with Greece, near İpsala, to the junction with the D.100 in Kınalı. The road is the main route into Greece and one of only two roads that cross the Greek border from Turkey. The entire route is a four-lane highway, except for the two-lane bridge crossing the Maritsa river. The D.110 is a part of the E84 for its entire length and part of the E90 from the Greek border to Keşan.

Route description

Edirne Province

The D.110 begins at the Greece/Turkey border on a two-lane bridge crossing over the Maritsa river. Following the Turkish customs checkpoint, the route becomes a four-lane highway heading east and is named London Asphalt until the intersection with the İL 22-50, just south of İpsala. Past the intersection, the route is named the Tekirdağ-İpsala Road until reaching the city of Tekirdağ. Just north of Keşan, the D.110 crosses the D.550. The intersection consists of a roundabout with a flying junction for westbound traffic heading south on the D.550. After Keşan the road continues east until passing through a few rolling hills and entering Tekirdağ Province.

Tekirdağ Province

Once past the hills, the D.110 once again enters a mostly flat plain. Before the town of Malkara, the route intersects with the İL 59-53. About  past Malkara, the route intersects with the D.555, which heads south to Şarköy. Coming south from Balıkesir and Çanakkale, the Kınalı-Balıkesir Motorway, currently under construction, will parallel the D.110 for the remainder of its route east to Kınalı. Four exits connecting the motorway to the D.110 are planned and as of 2017, one is under construction, near Malkara. Once the route reaches Tekirdağ, it heads northeast, diverging from Atatürk Boulevard running through the city, and skims the outskirts as a beltway. This section of the road is named the Kanuni Sultan Suleiman Boulevard, after the 10th Sultan of the Ottoman Empire and intersects with another section of the D.555, followed by the D.565. East of Tekirdağ, the D.110 runs along the coast of the Sea of Marmara serving many vacation homes along the route. This portion of the route is named the Tekirdağ-Istanbul Road. After passing just north of Marmaraereğlisi, the D.110 intersects with the D.567 and enters the Istanbul Province, shortly after.

Istanbul Province

The D.110 continues along the coast through many unincorporated neighborhoods of vacation homes until reaching the D.100 in Kınalı. The two routes interchange via a Trumpet interchange and the D.100 continues towards Istanbul.

Itinerary 
{| class="wikitable"
!rowspan="2" |Province
!rowspan="2" |Location
!colspan="3" |Distance from (km)
|-
!previous location
!Ipsala
!Kınalı
|-
|rowspan="4" style="text-align:left;" |Edirne 
|-
|Ipsala Checkpoint at Greece–Turkey border crossing ||0 ||0 ||172
|-
|Ipsala ||6 ||6 ||166
|-
|Keşan ||23 ||29 ||143
|-
|rowspan="3" style="text-align:left;" |Tekirdağ ||Malkara ||23 ||52 ||120
|-
|Tekirdağ ||61 ||113 ||59
|-
|Marmara Ereğlisi ||40 ||153 ||19
|-
|style="text-align:left;" |Istanbul ||Kınalı ||19 ||172 ||0

Intersections
 in Kınalı near Silivri
 near Keşan
 near Tekirdağ
 in Tekirdağ

See also
 European route E84

References

External links

110
Transport in Edirne Province
Transport in Tekirdağ Province
Transport in Istanbul Province